The 1894 Washington football team was an American football team that represented the University of Washington during the 1894 college football season. In its first season under Charles Cobb, the Washington team compiled a 1–1–1 record and outscored its opponents by a combined total of 60 to 38. Ralph Nichols was the team captain.

Schedule

References

Washington
Washington Huskies football seasons
Washington football